Reguzzoni is an Italian surname. Notable people with the surname include:

Carlo Reguzzoni (1908–1996), Italian footballer
Marco Reguzzoni (born 1971), Italian politician and entrepreneur

See also
Regazzoni

Italian-language surnames